Spachea correae is a species of plant in the Malpighiaceae family. It is found in Costa Rica and Panama. It is threatened by habitat loss.

References

Malpighiaceae
Vulnerable plants
Taxonomy articles created by Polbot